Michael Betz (born 19 February 1962) is a German ice hockey player. He competed in the men's tournament at the 1984 Winter Olympics.

Career statistics

References

External links
 

1962 births
Living people
EV Landshut players
Starbulls Rosenheim players
German ice hockey players
Olympic ice hockey players of West Germany
Ice hockey players at the 1984 Winter Olympics
Sportspeople from Landshut